Anzaldo is a location in the Cochabamba Department in central Bolivia. It is the seat of the Anzaldo Municipality, the second municipal section of the Esteban Arce Province.

The municipality's population is 9,126 residents according to the 2012 Census.

References

External links
 Map of Esteban Arce Province

Populated places in Cochabamba Department